Mallam Aliyu Mai-Bornu (1919 – 23 February 1970) was a Nigerian economist, and the first indigenous Governor of the Central Bank of Nigeria.

Life

Early life and education
Mai-Bornu was born in the town of Yola to parents of Kanuri heritage. 
His father was a councillor in the Lamido Native Authority and initially opposed Mai-Bornu's attendance of school until he was persuaded by the Lamido to give Mai-Bornu a chance. Mai-Bornu attended Yola Elementary School, Yola Middle School, and was admitted to Kaduna College in 1938, graduating in 1942 as an English language teacher. He started his teaching career at his alma mater, Yola Middle School, from 1942 to 1946 before proceeding to another one of his alma maters, Kaduna College (1946–1952), and soon joined the Northern Teachers Association. In 1952, he returned to Yola as deputy headmaster of the Yola Middle School and later left Yola to be a house tutor at the Veterinary School in Vom for five months. He earned a government scholarship to travel abroad and studied economics at Bristol University in the United Kingdom, graduating in 1957.

Career
Mai-Bornu returned to Nigeria and obtained a post as administrative officer with the Northern Nigeria Public Service (1957–1959) serving in the Public Service Commission and Ministry of Finance and Trade. When the Central Bank started operations in 1959, he was seconded to the Central Bank of Nigeria as an assistant secretary. He rapidly rose through the ranks from assistant secretary to deputy secretary, then secretary. In 1962, he became the first Nigerian to be appointed deputy governor. On July 25, 1963, Mai-Bornu was appointed governor of the Central Bank (1963–1967). After leaving the bank, he was appointed director and general manager of the Nigerian Tobacco Company (1967–1969). He served on the board of directors of the company until his death on 23 February 1970.
His portrait features on the 1,000 Naira note brought into circulation on October 12, 2005.

References

1919 births
1970 deaths
Nigerian Muslims
Nigerian bankers
Central bankers
Governors of the Central Bank of Nigeria
Kanuri people
People from Adamawa State